The 2008 Iceland earthquake was a doublet earthquake that struck on May 29 at 15:46 UTC in southwestern Iceland. The recorded magnitudes of the two main quakes were 5.9  and 5.8 , respectively, giving a composite magnitude of 6.1 . There were no human fatalities, but 30 injuries were reported and a number of sheep were killed. It was the strongest earthquake to hit Iceland since the summer of 2000.

Characteristics 

Iceland straddles the mid-Atlantic ridge where the Eurasian and North-American tectonic plates move away from each other. Volcanic activity is common along such divergent boundaries but strong earthquakes are rare. In Iceland the ridge is somewhat off-set, creating two transform faults where plates move horizontally along each other. One is in the north of the country and one in the south; the strongest Icelandic earthquakes happen along those transform faults. The 29 May quake is classified by geologists as typical Suðurlandsskjálftar (literally: Southern Iceland quakes), which happen on the southern fault.

Damage 
Unlike the quakes in the summer of 2000, the 29 May quake happened in the most densely populated part of the South Iceland district. The population of the affected area is about 12,000 and it includes the towns of Selfoss and Hveragerði as well as Eyrarbakki, Stokkseyri and Þorlákshöfn. Many farms were also affected.

See also 
 Geology of Iceland
 List of earthquakes in 2008
 List of earthquakes in Iceland

References

Sources 
 
  
 .

Further reading 
 Vogfjord, K. S., et al. "Fault interaction in the South Iceland Seismic Zone: The May 2008, M6. 3 earthquake". EGU General Assembly Conference Abstracts. Vol. 11. 2009.
 Brandsdottir, Bryndis, et al. "The May 29th 2008 earthquake aftershock sequence within the South Iceland Seismic Zone: Fault locations and source parameters of aftershocks." Jökull 60 (2010): 1–22.

External links 
 

Iceland
Earthquake
Earthquakes in Iceland
May 2008 events in Europe
Doublet earthquakes